Love Library may refer one of two university libraries in the United States of America:

Don L. Love Memorial Library, at the University of Nebraska–Lincoln in Lincoln, Nebraska
Malcolm A. Love Library, at San Diego State University in San Diego, California

See also
At the Love Library, a 2009 EP by Everlife